William "Duff" Armstrong (1833–1899) was an American Union soldier and the defendant in an 1858 murder prosecution in which he was defended by Abraham Lincoln, two years before he was elected President of the United States. The case would later be portrayed in the 1939 film Young Mr. Lincoln.

Early life 
Armstrong was born to Jack and Hannah Armstrong. Jack died in 1857. Abraham Lincoln was a friend of the Armstrongs and regularly visited and would cradle baby William.

Murder trial
Armstrong was charged with the August 29, 1857, murder of James Preston Metzker in Mason County, Illinois. His father, Jack Armstrong, had been a friend of Lincoln while he was studying law in New Salem, Illinois. When Lincoln heard of the murder charge, he wrote to Jack's widow, Hannah, and volunteered his legal services pro bono. The trial was moved to Cass County and held at the courthouse at Beardstown, Illinois.

Witness Charles Allen testified that he saw Duff Armstrong strike Metzker with a slungshot. Under cross-examination, Lincoln pushed for further detail and Charles Allen testified that he was at a distance of 150 feet, but could clearly see the act by the light of the moon. Abraham Lincoln used judicial notice, then a very uncommon tactic, to show Allen lied on the stand when he claimed he had witnessed the crime in the moonlight. Lincoln produced an almanac to show that the moon on that date would not have provided enough light for the witness to see anything clearly. Based on this evidence, the jury acquitted Armstrong after only one ballot.

Service in the Civil War 
Armstrong went on to join the Union forces in the American Civil War. He became ill in 1863 and, at his mother's request, Lincoln arranged for Armstrong's discharge.

Death and burial 
Armstrong lived long after the war; his death was reported in The New York Times on May 14, 1899.

William Duff Armstrong is buried in the New Hope Cemetery in Mason County, IL. A small informational plaque is erected at his gravesite which reads, "WILLIAM DUFF ARMSTRONG accused slayer of Preston Metzker, May 7, 1858 freed by Lincoln in Almanac Trial".

References

External links
 US Naval Observatory: Phases of the moon for CY 1857
 BioData
 

1833 births
1899 deaths
1858 in the United States
Abraham Lincoln
Cass County, Illinois
People acquitted of murder
People from Mason County, Illinois
Union Army soldiers